Aporia is the debut studio album by English alternative metal band Forever Never. It was released in 2006 by Copro Records. The digital release is entitled Aphoria V2, and contains the original twelve tracks and four live tracks.

Track listing 
All songs written by Forever Never. All lyrics by R. Carroll.

 "Aporia" – 4:47
 "This World" – 5:03
 "Better The Epic" – 4:00
 "Never" – 4:33
 "0707" – 4:17
 "As I Lie" – 4:16
 "Scared To Scarred – 3:36
 "New Arrival" – 4:20
 "Reversal" – 4:03
 "Saviour?" – 4:55
 "Drowning" – 4:14
 "Silent Elegy To The Living" – 4:41
 "Aphoria (live)" – 5:00
 "As I Lie (live)" – 5:31
 "Drowning (live)" – 4:27
 "This world (live)" – 5:15

Personnel 
 Renny Carroll – vocals
 Kev Yates – bass
 Sam Machin – guitar
 George Lenox – guitar
 Mike Row – drums

References

External links
 http://www.forevernever.com/
https://web.archive.org/web/20080330231516/http://www.coprorecords.co.uk/Casket/DisplayBand.asp?ID=94

2006 debut albums
Forever Never albums